Keith Wayne Valigura (November 6, 1957 – January 12, 2021) was an American politician who served in the Texas House of Representatives from the 16th district from 1985 to 1991.

Valigura was born in College Station, Texas, and graduated from Conroe High School in Conroe, Texas. He graduated from Sam Houston State University and went to Texas A&M University. Valigura graduate from South Texas College of Law Houston and practiced law in Montgomery County, Texas. He died on January 12, 2021, in Conroe, Texas, at age 63.

References

1957 births
2021 deaths
People from College Station, Texas
People from Conroe, Texas
Sam Houston State University alumni
Texas A&M University alumni
South Texas College of Law alumni
Texas lawyers
Republican Party members of the Texas House of Representatives